The United States Air Force's 149th Combat Communications Squadron (149th CBCS) is an Air National Guard combat communications unit located at North Highlands Air National Guard Station, California.

History
The 149th CBCS deployed five IC4Us to support Hurricane Katrina's recovery effort. The task force was based at Belle Chasse Naval Air Station, Louisiana supporting Task Force Pelican—which includes three sub-task forces delivering a balanced mix of engineer, aviation, logistical, communication, security, and evacuation support to New Orleans' disaster stricken
residents.

Assignments

Major Command/Gaining Command
Air National Guard/Air Combat Command (1992–present)
Air National Guard/Tactical Air Command (???–1992)
Air National Guard/Air Defense Command (???–1992)

Wing/Group
162d Combat Communications Group (195?–Present)
162d Tactical Control Group (???)

Previous designations
 149th Combat Communications Squadron (???–Present)
149th Aircraft Control and Warning Flight (1 February 1953–???)
149th Aircraft Control and Warning Squadron (24 May 1946 – 1 February 1953)

Bases stationed
North Highlands ANGS, California (???–present)
Del Paso ANGB, Texas (???–???)
Ellington AFB, Texas (15 May 1951 – 1 February 1953)

See also
162d Combat Communications Group – parent unit to the 149th CBCS

References

External links
California Air National Guard: "149th Combat Communications Squadron"

Combat Communications 0149
Combat Communications 0149
Military units and formations in California